Pia Wadjari is a medium-sized Aboriginal community, located in the Mid-West region of Western Australia, within the Shire of Murchison.

Native title 
The community is located within the registered Wajarri Yamatji (WAD6033/98) native title claim area.

Education 
Children of school age at Pia Wadjari attend the Pia Wadjarri Remote Community School. The school caters for students in years K–12 and has an enrolment of up to 20 students.

Governance 
The community is managed through its incorporated body, Pia Wadjari Aboriginal Corporation, incorporated under the Aboriginal Councils and Associations Act 1976 on 11 September 1986.

Town planning 
Pia Wadjari Layout Plan No.1 has been prepared in accordance with State Planning Policy 3.2 Aboriginal Settlements. Layout Plan No.1 was endorsed by the community on 2 September 2002 and the Western Australian Planning Commission on 1 July 2003.

Notes

External links
 Office of the Registrar of Indigenous Corporations
 Native title Claimant application summary

Aboriginal communities in Mid West (Western Australia)